Casey Adam Schouten (born 29 March 1994) is a Canadian male volleyball player. He is part of the Canada men's national volleyball team. On club level he plays for Jihostroj České Budějovice.

References

External links
 Casey Adam Schouten at the International Volleyball Federation
 

1994 births
Living people
Canadian men's volleyball players
Place of birth missing (living people)